Datil may refer to:
 Datil, New Mexico, a community and unincorporated town in Catron County, western New Mexico
 "Datil" (rocket launch facility), the launch site of the MGM-29 Sergeant intermediate-range ballistic missiles, in New Mexico 
 Datil pepper, a variety of yellow lantern chile peppers (Capsicum sinense)
 Datil-Mogollon Section, a physiographic subdivision of Colorado Plateau Province (western New Mexico and eastern Arizona)
 Mogollon-Datil volcanic field, a large silicic volcanic field in western New Mexico (Mogollon Mountains—town of Datil area)
 Datil National Forest, established 1908, merged in 1931, name discontinued